Bretyak (Berätäk) is a rural locality (a village) in Askarovsky Selsoviet, Burzyansky District, Bashkortostan, Russia. The population was 424 as of 2010. There are 7 streets.

Geography 
Bretyak is located 94 km north of Starosubkhangulovo (the district's administrative centre) by road. Novosaitovo is the nearest rural locality.

References 

Rural localities in Burzyansky District